Mavki'im (lit. Breakthroughs) is a moshav in southern Israel. Located near Ashkelon, it falls under the jurisdiction of Hof Ashkelon Regional Council.

History
The moshav was founded in 1949 as a kibbutz by demobilised IDF soldiers who had immigrated from Hungary, and was built on the former lands of the depopulated Palestinian village of Barbara. In 1954 it was converted to a moshav shitufi. Its name refers to the IDF breakthrough against the Egyptian army in the area during the 1948 Arab–Israeli War.

In 2005 the moshav absorbed 25 families who had been evacuated from Pe'at Sadeh as part of the disengagement plan.

References

Moshavim
Former kibbutzim
Populated places established in 1949
Gaza envelope
Populated places in Southern District (Israel)
1949 establishments in Israel